Jesús Arredondo Velázquez (born 22 June 1964) is a Mexican politician from the National Action Party. From 2006 to 2009 he served as Deputy of the LX Legislature of the Mexican Congress representing Querétaro.

References

1964 births
Living people
Politicians from Querétaro
National Action Party (Mexico) politicians
21st-century Mexican politicians
Autonomous University of Queretaro alumni
Members of the Congress of Querétaro
Deputies of the LX Legislature of Mexico
Members of the Chamber of Deputies (Mexico) for Querétaro